The Battle of Kingston (November 24, 1863) saw Major General Joseph Wheeler with two divisions of Confederate cavalry attempt to overcome the Union garrison of Kingston, Tennessee, led by Colonel Robert K. Byrd. The Confederates mistakenly believed that the Kingston garrison was weak, but in fact, it comprised a brigade of infantry and a regiment of mounted infantry. When Wheeler's cavalrymen began probing the Union position, they discovered that its defenders were too numerous, and the position was too strong. The Confederate cavalry withdrew to rejoin Lieutenant General James Longstreet's forces in the Siege of Knoxville, but Wheeler himself returned to the Army of Tennessee near Chattanooga.

Notes

References

Conflicts in 1863
1863 in Tennessee
Knoxville campaign
Battles of the Western Theater of the American Civil War
Union victories of the American Civil War
Battles of the American Civil War in Tennessee
November 1863 events